Reto Hug (born 24 January 1975 in Marthalen) is a former athlete from Switzerland, who competed in the triathlon.

Athletic career

Olympics
Hug competed in his first Olympic triathlon at the 2000 Summer Olympics.  He took eighth place with a total time of 1:49:21.30. At the following games, Hug competed again in the triathlon competition, placing 40th with a time of 2:01:40.43. In 2008, Hug returned to the Olympics and placed 29th in triathlon with a time of 1:52:04.93.

ITU events
In International Triathlon Union (ITU), Hug has taken 2nd at the 2005 ITU Triathlon World Championships and placed 3rd at the 2008 ITU Triathlon World Championships. He is also the 1999 ETU Triathlon European Champion.

Following the end of 2012 season he retired from professional sport. He is married to Swiss triathlete Nicola Spirig. They have a son, born in 2013 and a daughter, born 2017.

References

1975 births
Living people
Swiss male triathletes
Olympic triathletes of Switzerland
Triathletes at the 2000 Summer Olympics
Triathletes at the 2004 Summer Olympics
Triathletes at the 2008 Summer Olympics